Sebastian Gryphius (c. 1492, in Reutlingen – 1556, in Lyon) was a German bookseller-printer and humanist.

Biography 

He was the son of Michael Greyff (Greif, Gryff, Gryph), and learned from him the new craft of printing, in Germany and then in Venice. Around 1520 he came to Lyon and settled there, on behalf of a Venetian firm of booksellers.

Initially Gryphius mostly published works on law and administration, in Gothic script. He then moved to Latin classics. He also translated classical Greek authors into Latin. He published his contemporaries Erasmus, Guillaume Budé and Poliziano.

In 1536 he went into business with Hugues de la Porte, who financed him in an independent venture. He founded l'Atelier du Griffon, with a griffin mark. Around this time he introduced the Italic type of Aldus Manutius.

In the 1540s he was the highly reputed 'Prince of the Lyon book trade'. He promoted the local humanist culture, and his books were prized for their clean lay-out and accuracy. The nineteenth-century scholar Henri Baudrier spoke of Sebastian Gryphius's printshop (Atelier du Griffon) as a « société angélique pour les libres-penseurs ».

His friends included André Alciat, Étienne Dolet, Guillaume Scève and Barthélémy Aneau, and they wrote highly of his work, even helping out in practical printing tasks. Their linguistic input was also of benefit to the works printed. Gryphius printed suspect texts and even sheltered authors in trouble for heretical writing. Étienne Dolet, an academic and satirical poet, came fresh from jail in Toulouse, and was burned as a heretic in 1546.

From 1540, François Rabelais came to Gryphius to publish his translations of Hippocrates,  Galen and Giovanni Mainardi.

Family 
His brother Franz (François) was a printer in the rue des Carmes in Paris from 1532. Another brother, Johann (Jean), remained in Venice, also as a printer. His illegitimate son Antoine (1527?-1599) succeeded him at his printing shop in Lyon. Antoine Gryphius was the father of Sébastien II Gryphius, born around 1570, a bookseller in Lyon and later in Bordeaux.

Legacy 
There is a street named after him in la Guillotière, in the seventh arrondissement of Lyon.
The journal of the Bibliothèque de Lyon is called Gryphe.

Notes

References 
 
 Bibliothèque nationale de France.

External links
Princeton.edu
450th anniversary of his death in 2006 : ''Quid novi? Sébastien Gryphe à l'occasion du 450e anniversaire de sa mort"
Typographical material at Flickr by History of the Book, Amsterdam
 Gryphius Collection: Books printed by Sebastianus Gryphius in Lyons in the sixteenth century, (135 titles). From the Rare Book and Special Collections Division at the Library of Congress

1492 births
1556 deaths
People from Reutlingen
German printers
French printers
German booksellers
French booksellers